Joseph Bologne, Chevalier de Saint-Georges (25 December 1745 – 10 June 1799), was a French Creole virtuoso violinist and composer, who was conductor of the leading symphony orchestra in Paris. 

Saint-Georges was born in the then-French colony of Guadeloupe, the son of Georges de Bologne Saint-Georges, a wealthy married planter, and an enslaved Senegalese African woman named Nanon. At the age of seven he was taken to France, and at the age of thirteen educated as gendarme to the King. He received music lessons from François-Joseph Gossec and likely violin lessons from Jean-Marie Leclair, while continuing to study fencing.

In 1764 Antonio Lolli dedicated two concertos to Saint-Georges. In 1769 he joined a new symphony orchestra, “Le Concert des amateurs,” consisting of amateurs and professionals, and founded by Gossec; by two years later (1771) he was appointed concertmaster and soon started composing. In 1773 he was appointed the orchestra's conductor. In 1775 he introduced the symphonie concertante, using the possibilities offered by a new bow. In 1776 he was proposed as the next conductor of the Paris Opera but was subsequently denied this role by a petition by the divas of the time to the Queen. In 1778, he was living at the house of the Duc d'Orléans on the Chaussee d'Antin, when Mozart also  was a guest there for two and a half months. He stopped composing instrumental works altogether by 1785. However, he was still acquainted with and remained friendly with several composers (notably, Salieri, Gossec, Gretry, Mozart and Gluck).  After Le Concert des Amateurs disbanded in 1781, he joined a new orchestra formed by a masonic lodge that was called Le Concert de la Loge Olympique. He was a conductor of the unusually large orchestra of professionals and amateurs and in 1784 was authorized to commission Franz Joseph Haydn to write six symphonies for them. These works were premiered in 1787 and are known today as Haydn’s “Paris” symphonies, nos. 82-87. He travelled to London for a personal meeting with the Prince of Wales and George III, in 1787. 

Following the 1789 outbreak of the French Revolution, and now approaching 45 years of age, Saint-Georges served as a colonel of the  Légion St.-Georges, established in 1792 as the first all-black regiment in Europe, and the first of its kind to be defending the French First Republic. 

Today, le Chevalier de Saint-Georges is best remembered as the earliest European musician/composer, of full or partial African descent, to receive widespread critical acclaim; becoming concertmaster and (supposed to have been) conductor of the Paris symphonic institution, no less. This achievement was rendered all the more iconic, having been attained in a particularly uncertain, turbulent time in French (and world) history. He published numerous string quartets, sonatas, and symphonies. In addition to his many violin concertos, Saint-Georges also composed several stage works (plays, comedies, ballet), a rondeau for two violins, an adagio in F-minor (for piano), a harpsichord quartet, and several operas — he even composed a children’s opera, “Aline et Dupré, ou le marchand de marrons,” G.204.

Early life

Joseph Bologne was born in Baillif, Basse-Terre as the son of a planter and former councillor at the parliament of Metz,  (1711–1774) and Nanon, his wife's 16-year-old enslaved African servant of Senegalese origin, who served as her personal maid. Bologne was legally married to Elisabeth Mérican (1722–1801) but acknowledged his son by Nanon and gave him his surname.

His father, called "de Saint-Georges" after one of his plantations in Guadeloupe, was a commoner until 1757, when he acquired the title of Gentilhomme ordinaire de la chambre du roi (Gentleman of the King's Chamber). The younger Saint-Georges was ineligible under French law for titles of nobility due to his African mother. Since 1685, a Code Noir had been the law in France and its colonial possessions. On 5 April 1762, King Louis XV decreed that "Nègres et gens de couleur" (blacks and people of color) must register with the clerk of the Admiralty within two months. Many leading ”Enlightenment” thinkers (like Voltaire) argued that Africans and their descendants were inferior to White Europeans. These racist legal bindings and attitudes towards mixed-race citizens made it virtually impossible for Joseph Bologne to marry any woman at his level of society; however, he is known to have had at least one long-term, serious and romantic relationship.

Misled by Roger de Beauvoir's 1840 romantic novel Le Chevalier de Saint-Georges, most of his biographers confused Joseph's father with Jean de Boullonges, Controller-General of Finances between 1757 and 1759. This led to the erroneous spelling of Saint-Georges' family name as "Boulogne", persisting to this day, even in records in the Bibliothèque nationale de France.

In 1753, his father took Joseph, aged seven, to France for his education, installed him in a boarding school, and returned to Guadeloupe. Two years later, on 26 August 1755, listed as passengers on the ship L'Aimable Rose, Bologne de Saint-Georges and his favorite Nanon landed in Bordeaux. In Paris, reunited with their son Joseph, they moved into a spacious apartment in the 6th Arrondissement at 49 rue Saint André des Arts.

"At 15 his [Bologne's] progress was so rapid, that he was already beating the best swordsmen, and at 17 he developed the greatest speed imaginable." Bologne was still a student when he beat Alexandre Picard, a fencing master in Rouen, who had been mocking him as "Boëssière's mulatto", in public. That match, bet on heavily by a public divided into partisans and opponents of slavery, was an important coup for Bologne. His father, proud of his feat, rewarded Joseph with a handsome horse and buggy. In 1766 on graduating from the Royal Polytechnique Academy, Bologne was made a Gendarme du roi (officer of the king's bodyguard) and a chevalier. Henceforth Joseph Bologne, by adopting the suffix of his father, would be known as the "Chevalier de Saint-Georges". As an illegitimate son, he was ineligible to inherit his father's title.

In 1764, at the end of the Seven Years' War, Georges Bologne returned to Guadeloupe to look after his plantations. The following year, he made a last will and testament where he left Joseph an annuity of 8,000 francs and an adequate pension to Nanon, who remained with their son in Paris. When his father died in 1774 in Guadeloupe, he awarded his annuity to his legitimate daughter, Elisabeth Benedictine.

Long before her death, Saint-Georges's mother would also record a testamentary deed dated 18 June 1778, in which she gives and bequeaths all her belongings. However, according to biographer Pierre Bardin, she signed "Anne Danneveau," and refers to her son as "Mr De Boulonge St-George," reflecting her desire to distance herself from her son thus further conceal Saint-Georges's African origins.

According to Bologne's friend, Louise Fusil: "... admired for his fencing and riding prowess, he served as a model to young sportsmen ... who formed a court around him." A fine dancer, Saint-Georges was also invited to balls and welcomed in the salons (and boudoirs) of highborn ladies. "Partial for the music of liaisons where amour had real meaning... he loved and was loved." Yet he continued to fence daily in the various salles of Paris. There he met Domenico and son Henry Angelo, fencing masters from London; the mysterious Chevalier d'Éon; and the teenage Louis Philippe II, Duke of Orléans, all of whom would play a role in his future.

Later life 
During his time at the opera and before the revolution, Saint-Georges became the darling of many women in the salons and drawing rooms of Paris society. As was often said, 'he loved and was loved.' One potential suitor of his was the esteemed dancer Marie-Madeleine Guimard, whose advances he declined. Having been spurned, and with great influence in the Queen's court, La Guimard would come to play a pivotal role in the petition that would deny Joseph's ambition to become the director of the Paris Opera from ever coming to fruition.

Pierre Lefebvre de Beauvray, a gossip writer at the time, author of a work entitled Journal d'un bourgeois de Popincourt, attributes to Saint-Georges a love affair with the Marquise Marie-Josephine de Montalembert, salonnière and novelist, young wife of an old general. She was a talented society actress, and arguably the love of his life. Her husband was a general of military engineering in the Queen's Court (Marc René, marquis de Montalembert); his wife was said to have been drawn to the young composer. Their affair was later discovered and consequently upended, but not before she bore him a child. The infant was taken from Marie-Josephine and sent by her husband to a nearby village to essentially die; the disgrace that was brought to the marquis was then hidden away. According to noted biographer Gabriel Banat, "Saint-Georges mourned the loss of one who was most likely his greatest love and the death of the son he never saw".

St. Georges assaulted

On 22 April 1779, around midnight, Saint-Georges was attacked in the streets of Paris as he was returning home with one of his friends. Malicious spirits claimed that this punitive expedition had been decided by the monarch's secret services. It is interesting to know that this attack is reported differently by several memoirs of the time and later by the knight's biographers, examples among many others of the fragility of testimonies, even if they were written by contemporaries.

In one of the thirty-six volumes of his Secret Memoirs, Louis Petit de Bachaumont mentions that the attack took place on the night of 1 May 1779. This date is incorrect and, moreover, he reports that Saint-Georges was attacked by six men. He and his friend would have valiantly defended themselves and were providentially saved by the watch and its men-at-arms:

It was suggested that the Marquis de Montalembert, eager to avenge his honor and punish the "seducer" of his wife by setting up a night operation, was behind the nocturnal aggression.

Revolution

Since he was of mixed race, Saint-Georges was affected by the racism and racist laws in pre-Revolutionary France. On 26 August 1789, when the revolution declared equal rights to all French people, Saint-Georges embraced The Declaration of the Rights of Man and of the Citizen. In June 1791, the Parliament recruited volunteers from the entire French National Guard. Saint-Georges was the first person to sign in Lille. 

On 7 September 1792, the Parliament established a light cavalry consisting of volunteers from the West Indies and Africa. The name of it was "Légion franche de cavalerie des Américains et du Midi", but it was later often referred to as "Légion St-Georges" because of the outstanding performance of Colonel Saint-Georges. On 20 March 1793 Danton and Charles-François Delacroix were sent to Lille. Dumouriez sensed a trap and invited them to his headquarters at Saint-Amand-les-Eaux. They were escorted by Chevalier de Saint-Georges.

St. Georges was condemned by critics for being involved in non-revolutionary activities such as music events, and was dismissed and imprisoned for 18 months. Despite the support given by his soldiers and lower-level cadres, he was released but did not resume command after the appeal and was banned from dealing with his former comrades. Saint-Georges returned to St Domingue for a while. However, there was a fierce civil war  between the revolutionaries and royalists. St. Georges was very disappointed with St-Domingue and returned to France. In 1797, he tried to join the army again and signed his petition "George". St. Georges wrote:

 On 10 June 1799, Saint-Georges died of gangrene.

Musical life and career

Nothing is known about Saint-Georges' early musical training. Given his prodigious technique as an adult, Saint-Georges must have practiced the violin seriously as a child. There has been no documentation found of him as a musician before 1764, when violinist Antonio Lolli composed two concertos, Op. 2, for him, and 1766, when composer François-Joseph Gossec dedicated a set of six string trios, Op. 9, to Saint Georges.  Lolli may have worked with Bologne on his violin technique and Gossec on compositions. Beauvoir's novel says that "Platon", a fictional whip-toting slave commander on Saint-Domingue, "taught little Saint-Georges" the violin.

Historians have discounted François-Joseph Fétis' claim that Saint-Georges studied violin with Jean-Marie Leclair. Some of his technique was said to reveal influence by Pierre Gaviniès. Other composers who later dedicated works to Saint-Georges were Carl Stamitz in 1770, and Avolio in 1778.

In 1769, the Parisian public was amazed to see Saint-Georges, the great fencer, playing as a violinist in Gossec's new orchestra, Le Concert des Amateurs. Four years later he became its concertmaster/conductor. In 1772 Saint-Georges created a sensation with his debut as a soloist, playing his first two violin concertos, Op. II, with Gossec conducting the orchestra. "These concertos were performed last winter at a concert of the Amateurs by the author himself, who received great applause as much for their performance as for their composition." According to another source, "The celebrated Saint-Georges, mulatto fencer [and] violinist, created a sensation in Paris ... [when] two years later ... at the Concert Spirituel, he was appreciated not as much for his compositions as for his performances, enrapturing especially the feminine members of his audience."

Saint-Georges's first composition, Op. I, was a set of six string quartets, among the first in France, published by famed French publisher, composer, and teacher Antoine Bailleux. They were inspired by Haydn's earliest quartets, brought from Vienna by Baron Bagge. Saint-Georges wrote two more sets of six string quartets, three forte-piano and violin sonatas, a sonata for harp and flute, and six violin duets. The music for three other known compositions was lost: a cello sonata, performed in Lille in 1792, a concerto for clarinet, and one for bassoon.

Saint-Georges wrote twelve additional violin concertos, two symphonies, and eight symphonie-concertantes, a new, intrinsically Parisian genre of which he was one of the chief exponents. He wrote his instrumental works over a short span of time, and they were published between 1771 and 1779. He also wrote six opéras comiques and a number of songs in manuscript.

In 1773, when Gossec took over the direction of the prestigious Concert Spirituel, he designated Saint-Georges as his successor as director of the Concert des Amateurs. After fewer than two years under the younger man's direction, the group was described as "Performing with great precision and delicate nuances [and] became the best orchestra for symphonies in Paris, and perhaps in all of Europe."

In 1781, Saint Georges's Concert des Amateurs had to be disbanded due to a lack of funding. Playwright and Secret du Roi spy Pierre Caron de Beaumarchais began to collect funds from private contributors, including many of the Concert's patrons, to send materiel aid for the American cause. The plan to send military aid via a fleet of fifty vessels and have those vessels return with American rice, cotton, or tobacco ended up bankrupting the French contributors as the American congress failed to acknowledge its debt and the ships were sent back empty. Saint-Georges turned to his friend and admirer, Philippe D'Orléans, duc de Chartres, for help. In 1773 at the age of 26, Philippe had been elected Grand Master of the 'Grand Orient de France' after uniting all the Masonic organizations in France. Responding to Saint-Georges's plea, Philippe revived the orchestra as part of the Loge Olympique, an exclusive Freemason Lodge.

Renamed Le Concert Olympique, with practically the same personnel, it performed in the grand salon of the Palais Royal. In 1785, Count D'Ogny, grand master of the Lodge and a member of its cello section, authorized Saint-Georges to commission Haydn to compose six new symphonies for the Concert Olympique. Conducted by Saint-Georges, Haydn's "Paris" symphonies were first performed at the Salle des Gardes-Suisses of the Tuileries, a much larger hall, in order to accommodate the huge public demand to hear Haydn's new works. Queen Marie Antoinette attended some of Saint-Georges's concerts at the Hôtel de Soubise, arriving sometimes without notice, so the orchestra wore court attire for all its performances. "Dressed in rich velvet or damask with gold or silver braid and fine lace on their cuffs and collars and with their parade swords and plumed hats placed next to them on their benches, the combined effect was as pleasing to the eye as it was flattering to the ear." Saint-Georges played all his violin concertos as a soloist with his orchestra.

Operas 

In 1776 the Académie royale de musique, the Paris Opéra, was struggling financially and artistically. Saint-Georges was proposed as the next director of the opera. As creator of the first disciplined French orchestra since Lully, he was the obvious choice. But, according to Baron von Grimm's Correspondance litteraire, philosophique et critique, three of the Opéra's leading ladies "... presented a placet (petition) to the Queen [Marie Antoinette] assuring Her Majesty that their honor and delicate conscience could never allow them to submit to the orders of a mulatto."

To defuse the brewing scandal, Louis XVI took the Opéra back from the city of Paris – ceded to it by Louis XIV a century before – to be managed by his Intendant of Light Entertainments. Following the "affair", Marie-Antoinette preferred to hold her musicales in the salon of her Petit appartement de la reine in Versailles. She limited the audience to her intimate circle and a few musicians, among them the Chevalier de Saint-Georges. "Invited to play music with the Queen," Saint-Georges probably played his violin sonatas, with Her Majesty playing the forte-piano.

The singers' placet may have ended Saint-Georges's aspirations to higher positions as a musician. But, over the next two years, he published two more violin concertos and a pair of his Symphonies concertantes. Thereafter, except for his final set of quartets (Op. 14, 1785), Saint-Georges abandoned composing instrumental music in favor of opera.

Ernestine, Saint-Georges's first opera, with a libretto by Pierre Choderlos de Laclos, future author of Les Liaisons dangereuses, was performed on 19 July 1777, at the Comédie-Italienne. It did not survive its premiere. The critics liked the music, but panned the weak libretto, which was then usually given precedence over the music. The Queen attended with her entourage. She came to support Saint-Georges's opera but, after the audience kept echoing a character cracking his whip and crying "Ohé, Ohé," the Queen gave it the coup de grace by calling to her driver: "to Versailles, Ohé!"

After the failure of the opera, the Marquise de Montesson, morganatic wife of the Duc d'Orléans, realized her ambition to engage Saint-Georges as music director of her fashionable private theater. He was glad to gain a position that entitled him to an apartment in the ducal mansion on the Chaussée d'Antin. After Mozart's mother died in Paris, the composer was allowed to stay at the mansion for a period with Melchior Grimm, who, as personal secretary of the Duke, lived in the mansion. Mozart and Saint-Georges lived from 5 July to 11 September 1778 under the same roof at Madame de Montesson. The Duc d'Orléans appointed Saint-Georges as Lieutenant de la chasse of his vast hunting grounds at Raincy, with an additional salary of 2000 Livres a year. "Saint-Georges the mulatto so strong, so adroit, was one of the hunters..."

Saint-Georges wrote and rehearsed his second opera, appropriately named La Chasse at Raincy. At its premiere in the Théâtre Italien, "The public received the work with loud applause. Vastly superior compared with Ernestine ... there is every reason to encourage him to continue [writing operas]." La Chasse was performed at her Majesty's request at the royal chateau at Marly. Saint-Georges's most successful opéra comique was L'Amant Anonyme, which was premiered in 1780, with a libretto based on a play of the same name by Madame de Montesson's niece, Madame de Genlis.

In 1785, the Duke of Orléans died. The Marquise de Montesson, his morganatic wife, having been forbidden by the King to mourn him, shuttered their mansion, closed her theater, and retired to a convent near Paris. With his patrons gone, Saint-Georges lost not only his positions, but also his apartment. His friend, Philippe, now Duke of Orléans, presented him with a small flat in the Palais- Royal. Living in the Palais, Saint-Georges was drawn into the whirlpool of political activity around Philippe, the new leader of the Orléanist party, the main opposition to the absolute monarchy.

Meanwhile the Duke's ambitious plans for re-constructing the Palais-Royal left the Orchestre Olympique without a home and Saint-Georges unemployed. Seeing his protégé at loose ends and recalling that the Prince of Wales often expressed a wish to meet the legendary fencer, Philippe approved Brissot's plan to dispatch Saint-Georges to London. He believed it was a way to ensure the Regent-in-waiting's support of Philippe as future "Regent" of France. But Brissot had a secret agenda as well. He considered Saint-Georges, a "man of color", the ideal person to contact his fellow abolitionists in London and ask their advice about Brissot's plans for Les Amis des Noirs (Friends of the Blacks) modelled on the English anti-slavery movement.

London and Lille 

In London, Saint-Georges stayed with fencing masters Domenico Angelo and Henry, his son, whom he knew as an apprentice from early years in Paris. They arranged exhibition matches for him, including one at Carlton House, before the Prince of Wales. After sparring with him, carte and tierce, the prince matched Saint-Georges with several renowned masters. One included La Chevalière D'Éon, aged 59, in a voluminous black dress. A painting by Abbé Alexandre-Auguste Robineau, violinist-composer and painter, showed the Prince and his entourage watching Mlle D'Éon score a hit on Saint-Georges, giving rise to rumours that the Frenchman allowed it out of gallantry for a lady. But, as Saint-Georges had fenced with dragoon Captain d'Éon in Paris, he probably was deferring to her age. Saint-Georges played one of his concertos at the Anacreontic Society. He also delivered Brissot's request to the abolitionists MPs William Wilberforce, John Wilkes, and the Reverend Thomas Clarkson. Before Saint-Georges left England, Mather Brown painted his portrait. Asked by Mrs Angelo if it was a true likeness, Saint-Georges replied: "Alas, Madame it is frightfully so."

Back in Paris, he completed and produced his latest opéra comique, La Fille Garçon, at the Théâtre des Italiens. The critics found the libretto wanting. "The piece, [was] sustained only by the music of Monsieur de Saint Georges... The success he obtained should serve as encouragement to continue enriching this theatre with his productions."

Meanwhile, having nearly completed reconstruction of the Palais-Royale, the Duke had opened several new theaters. The smallest was the Théâtre Beaujolais, a marionette theater for children, named after his youngest son, the duc de Beaujolais. The lead singers of the Opéra provided the voices for the puppets. Saint-Georges wrote the music of Le Marchand de Marrons (The Chestnut Vendor) for this theater, with a libretto by Madame de Genlis, Philippe's former mistress and then confidential adviser.

While Saint-Georges was away, the Concert Olympique had resumed performing at the Hôtel de Soubise, the old hall of the Amateurs. The Italian violinist Jean-Baptiste Viotti had been appointed as conductor. Disenchanted, Saint-Georges, together with the talented young singer Louise Fusil, and his friend, the horn virtuoso Lamothe, embarked on a brief concert tour in the North of France. On 5 May 1789, the opening day of the fateful Estates General, Saint-Georges, seated in the gallery with Laclos, heard Jacques Necker, Louis XVI's minister of finance, saying, "The slave trade is a barbarous practice and must be eliminated."

Choderlos de Laclos, who replaced Brissot as Philippe's chief of staff, intensified Brissot's campaign to promote Philippe as an alternative to the monarchy. Concerned by its success, Louis dispatched Philippe on a bogus mission to London. On 14 July 1789, the fall of the Bastille took place, starting the Revolution, and Philippe, Duke of Orléans, missed his chance to save the monarchy.

In September he was invited to go on a trip to London with his employer, the Duke of Orléans. Saint-Georges, sent ahead to London by Laclos, stayed at Grenier's. This hotel in Jermyn Street became patronised by French refugees. Saint-Georges was entertaining himself lavishly. Without salaries, he must have depended on Philippe. His assignment was to stay close to the Prince of Wales. As soon as Saint-Georges arrived, the Prince took the composer to his Marine Pavilion in Brighton. He also took him fox hunting and to the races at Newmarket. But when Philippe arrived, he became the Prince's regular companion. Saint-Georges was relieved to be free of the Prince.[section needs rewriting]

When Saint-Georges passed Brissot's request to the British abolitionists, they complied by translating their literature into French for his fledgling Société des amis des Noirs. Saint-Georges met with them again, this time on his own account. "Early in July, walking home from Greenwich, a man armed with a pistol demanded his purse. The Chevalier disarmed the man... but when four more rogues hidden until then attacked him, he put them all out of commission. M. de Saint Georges received only some contusions which did not keep him from going on that night to play music in the company of friends." The nature of the attack, with four attackers emerging after the first one made sure they had the right victim, has been claimed to be an assassination attempt disguised as a hold-up, arranged by the "Slave Trade" to put an end to his abolitionist activities.

A cartoon of the Chevalier fencing with Colonel Hanger captioned "St. George & the Dragon" appeared in the Morning Post on 12 April 1789. 

In late June, Philippe, dubbed "The Red Duke" in London, realized that his "mission" there was a ruse used by the French king to get him out of the country. He amused himself with the Prince, horse racing, young women and champagne. Philippe clung to a vague promise made by King Louis to make him Regent of the Southern Netherlands. In February they were in Brussels but the Belgians wanted a Republic, and rejected Philippe. In July 1790 the duke went to Paris, but Saint-Georges decided to join a fencing tournament in Lille. 

"On Thursday, July 8, 1790, in Lille's municipal ballroom, the famous Saint-Georges was the principal antagonist in a brilliant fencing tournament. Though ill, he fought with that grace which is his trademark. Lightning is no faster than his arms and in spite of running a fever, he demonstrated astonishing vigor." Two days later looking worse but in need of funds, he offered another assault, this one for the officers of the garrison. But his illness proved so serious that it sent him to bed for six long weeks. The diagnosis according to medical science at the time was "brain fever" (probably meningitis). Unconscious for days, he was taken in and nursed by some kind citizens of Lille. While still bedridden Saint-Georges began to compose an opera for Lille's theater company. Calling it Guillome tout Coeur, ou les amis du village, he dedicated it to the citizens of Lille. "Guillaume is an opera in one act. The music by Saint-George is full of sweet warmth of motion and spirit...Its [individual] pieces distinguished by their melodic lines and the vigor of their harmony. The public...made the hall resound with its justly deserved applause." It was to be his last opera, lost, including its libretto. He participated in local events and took charge of the music.

Louise Fusil, who had idolized Saint-Georges since she was a girl of 15, wrote: "In 1791, I stopped in Amiens where St. Georges and Lamothe were waiting for me, committed to give some concerts over the Easter holidays. We were to repeat them in Tournai. But the French refugees assembled in that town just across the border, could not abide the Créole they believed to be an agent of the despised Duke of Orléans. St. Georges was even advised [by its commandant] not to stop there for long." According to a report by a local newspaper: "The dining room of the hotel where St. Georges, a citizen of France, was also staying, refused to serve him, but he remained perfectly calm; remarkable for a man with his means to defend himself."

Louise describes the scenario of Saint-Georges' "Love and Death of the Poor Little Bird", a programmatic piece for violin alone, which he was constantly entreated to play especially by the ladies. Its three parts depicted the little bird greeting the spring; passionately pursuing the object of his love, who alas, has chosen another; its voice grows weaker then, after the last sigh, it is stilled forever. This kind of program music or sound painting of scenarios such as love scenes, tempests, or battles complete with cannonades and the cries of the wounded, conveyed by a lone violin, was by that time nearly forgotten. Louise places his improvisational style on a par with her subsequent musical idol, Hector Berlioz: "We did not know then this expressive ...depiction a dramatic scene, which Mr. Berlioz later revealed to us... making us feel an emotion that identifies us with the subject." Curiously, some of Saint-Georges' biographers are still looking for its score, but Louise's account leaves no doubt that it belonged to the lost art of spontaneous improvisation.

Tired of politics yet faithful to his ideals, St. Georges decided to serve the Revolution, directly. With 50,000 Austrian troops massed on its borders, the first citizen's army in modern history was calling for volunteers. In 1790, having recovered from his illness, Saint-Georges was one of the first in Lille to join its Garde Nationale. But not even his military duties in the Garde Nationale could prevent St. Georges from giving concerts. Once again he was building an orchestra which, according to the announcement in the paper, "Will give a concert every week until Easter." At the conclusion of the last concert, the mayor of Lille placed a crown of laurels on St. Georges' brow and read a poem dedicated to him.

On 20 April 1792, compelled by the National Assembly, Louis XVI declared war against his brother-in-law, Francis II. General Dillon, commander of Lille, was ordered by Dumouriez to attack Tournai, reportedly only lightly defended. Instead, massive fire by the Austrian artillery turned an orderly retreat into a rout by the regular cavalry but not that of the volunteers of the National Guard. Captain St. Georges, promoted in 1791, commanded the company of volunteers that held the line at Baisieux near the Belgian border. On 18 May, "M. St. Georges took charge of the music for a solemn requiem held [in Lille] for the souls of those who perished for their city on the fateful day of the 29 of April last."

Saint-Domingue

In Saint-Domingue, the news from abroad that the "whites of La France had risen up and killed their masters", spread among the black slaves of the island. "The rebellion was extremely violent ... the rich plain of the North was reduced to ruins and ashes ..." After months of arson and murder, Toussaint Louverture, a Haitian revolutionary, took charge of the slave revolt. In the Spring of 1796, a commission with 15,000 troops and tons of arms sailed for Saint-Domingue to abolish slavery. Second to Léger-Félicité Sonthonax, leader of the commission, was Julien Raimond, the founder of Saint-Georges's Légion.

According to Louise Fusil, Saint Georges and his friend Lamothe had been absent from Paris for nearly two years. "I since learned that they had left for Saint-Domingue, then in full revolt; it was rumoured they had been hanged in a mutiny. I gave them up for dead and mourned them with all my heart, when one day, as I sat in the Palais Royal with a friend absorbed in a magazine ... I looked up and screamed, thinking I saw ghosts. They were Lamothe and Saint Georges who, clowning, sang to me 'At last there you are! You thought we've been hanged /For almost two years what became of you?' 'No, I was not sure that you were hanged, but I did take you for ghosts, come back to haunt me!' 'We nearly are [ghosts] they answered, for we come from very far indeed.'"

It stands to reason that Julien Raimond would want to take St. Georges, an experienced officer, with him to Saint-Domingue, then in the throes of a bloody civil war. While we lack concrete evidence that St. Georges was aboard the convoy of the commission, the fact that we find Captain Colin, and Lamotte (Lamothe) on the payroll of a ship of the convoy to Saint-Domingue, confirms Louise Fusil's account. So does Lionel de La Laurencie's statement: "The expedition to Saint-Domingue was Saint-Georges' last voyage," adding that "Disenchantment and melancholy resulting from his experiences during that voyage must have weighed heavily on his aging shoulders"

Within a fortnight of returning from that harrowing journey, St. Georges was again building a symphony orchestra. Like his last ensemble, Le Cercle de l'Harmonie was also part of a Masonic lodge performing in what was formerly the Palais Royal. The founders of the new Loge, a group of nouveau riche gentlemen bent on re-creating the elegance of the old Loge Olympique, were delighted to find St. Georges back in Paris. According to Le Mercure Français, "The concerts ... under the direction of the famous Saint Georges, left nothing to be desired as to the choice of pieces or the superiority of their execution." Though a number of his biographers maintain that at the end of his life, St. Georges lived in abject poverty, the Cercle was not exactly the lower depths. Rejected by the army, St. Georges, at the age of 51, found solace in his music. Sounding like any veteran performer proud of his longevity, he said: "Towards the end of my life, I was particularly devoted to my violin," adding: "never before did I play it so well!"

In the late spring of 1799, there came bad news from Saint-Domingue: Generals Hédouville and Roume, the Directoire's emissaries, reverting to the discredited policy of stirring up trouble between blacks and mulattoes, succeeded in starting a war between pro-French André Rigaud's mulattoes, and separatist Toussaint Louverture's blacks. It was so savage that it became known as the "War of Knives". Hearing of it affected St. Georges, already suffering from a painful condition which he refused to acknowledge. Two of his contemporary obituaries reveal the course of his illness and death.

La Boëssière fils: "Saint-Georges felt the onset of a disease of the bladder and, given his usual negligence, paid it little attention; he even kept secret an ulcer, source of his illness; gangrene set in and he succumbed on 12 June 1799.

J. S. A. Cuvelier in his Necrology: "For some time he had been tormented by a violent fever ... his vigorous nature had repeatedly fought off this cruel illness; [but] after a month of suffering, the end came on 21 Prairial [June 9] at five o'clock in the evening. Some time before the end, St. Georges stayed with a friend [Captain Duhamel] in the rue Boucherat. His death was marked by the calm of the wise and the dignity of the strong."

Saint-Georges's death certificate was lost in a fire; what remains is only a report by the men who removed his body: "St. Georges Bologne, Joseph, rue Boucherat No. 13, Bachelor, 22 Prairial year 7, Nicholas Duhamel, Ex-officer, same house, former domicile rue de Chartres, taken away by Chagneau." Above the name "Joseph" someone, no doubt the "receiver", scribbled "60 years", merely an estimate which, mistaken for a death certificate, added to the confusion about Saint-Georges's birth-year. Since he was born in December 1745, he was only 53.

Nicholas Duhamel, the ex-officer mentioned in the report of the "receivers", a Captain in St. Georges' Legion, was his loyal friend until his death. Concerned about his old colonel's condition, he stopped by his apartment on rue de Chartres in the Palais Royal and, having found him dying, took him to his flat in rue Boucherat where he took care of him until the end.
This year died, twenty-four days apart, two extraordinary
but very different men, Beaumarchais and Saint-Georges;
both Masters at sparring; the one who could be touched by a
foil, was not the one who was more enviable for his virtues.
— Charles Maurice (1799)

Works

Operas
 Ernestine, opéra comique in 3 acts, libretto by Choderlos de Laclos revised by Desfontaines, première in Paris, Comédie Italienne, 19 July 1777, lost. Note: a few numbers survive.
 La Partie de chasse, opéra comique in 3 acts, libretto by Desfontaines, public premiere in Paris, Comédie Italienne, 12 October 1778, lost. Note: a few numbers survive.
 L'Amant anonyme (The Anonymous Lover), comédie mélée d'ariettes et de ballets, in 2 acts, after a play by Mme. de Genlis, première in Paris, Théâtre de Mme. de Montesson, 8 March 1780, complete manuscript in Paris Bibliothèque Nationale, section musique, côte 4076. The first critical edition of this, his lone surviving opera, was prepared by Opera Ritrovata for streaming performance by Los Angeles Opera and the Colburn School in November 2020.
 La Fille garçon, opéra comique mélée d'ariettes in 2 acts, libretto by Desmaillot, premiere in Paris, Comédie Italienne, 18 August 1787, lost.
 Aline et Dupré, ou le marchand de marrons, children's opera, premiere in le Théâtre du comte de Beaujolais, 1788. lost.
 Guillaume tout coeur ou les amis du village, opéra comique in one act, libretto by Monnet, première in Lille, 8 September 1790, lost.

Symphonies

Deux Symphonies à plusieurs instruments, Op. XI, No. 1 in G and No. 2 in D.

Note: 
No 1 is listed as 'spurious' by Grove Music Online.

No 2 is identical with the overture to Bologne's opéra comique, L'Amant anonyme. The orchestration consists of strings, two oboes and two horns.

Concertante

Violin concertos

Saint-Georges composed 14 violin concertos. Before copyrights, several publishers issued his concertos with both Opus numbers and numbering them according to the order in which they were
composed. The thematic incipits on the right, should clear up the resulting confusion.

 Op. II, No. 1 in G and No. 2 in D, published by Bailleux, 1773
 Op. III, No. 1 in D and No. 2 in C, Bailleux, 1774
 Op. IV, No. 1 in D and No. 2 in D, Bailleux, 1774 (No. 1 also published as "Op. post." while No. 2 is also known simply as "op. 4")
 Op. V, No.1 in C and No. 2 in A, Bailleux, 1775
 Op. VII, No. 1 in A and No. 2 in B-flat, Bailleux, 1777
 Op. VIII, No. 1 in D and No. 2 in G, Bailleux n/d (No. 2 issued by Sieber, LeDuc and Henry as No. 9. No. 1 is also known simply as "op. 8")
 Op. XII, No. 1 in E-flat and No. 2 in G, Bailleux 1777 (both issued by Sieber as No. 10 and No. 11)

Symphonies concertantes

 Op. VI, No. 1 in C and No. 2 in B-flat, Bailleux, 1775
 Op. IX, No. 1 in C and No. 2 in A, LeDuc, 1777
 Op. X, for two violins and viola, No. 1 in F and No. 2 in A, La Chevardière, 1778
 Op. XIII, No. 1 in E-flat and No. 2 in G, Sieber, 1778

Unlike the concertos, their publishers issued the symphonie-concertantes following Bailleux's original opus numbers, as shown by the incipits on the right.

Chamber music

Sonatas
Trois Sonates for keyboard with violin: B-flat, A, and G minor, Op. 1a, composed c. 1770, published in 1781 by LeDuc.
Sonata for harp with flute obligato, n.d.: E-flat, original MS in Bibliothèque Nationale, côte: Vm7/6118
Sonate de clavecin avec violin obligé G major, arrangement of Saint-Georges's violin concerto Op. II No. 1 in G, in the collection Choix de musique du duc regnant des Deux-Ponts
Six Sonatas for violin accompanied by a second violin: B-flat, E-flat, A, G, B-flat, A: Op. posth. Pleyel, 1800.
 Cello Sonata, lost, mentioned by a review in the Gazette du departement du Nord on 10 April 1792.

String quartet
Six quatuors à cordes, pour 2 vls, alto & basse, dédiés au prince de Robecq, in C, E-flat, G minor, C minor, G minor, & D. Op. 1; probably composed in 1770 or 1771, published by Sieber in 1773.
Six quartetto concertans "Au gout du jour", no opus number. In B-flat, G minor, C, F, G, and B-flat, published by Durieu in 1779.
Six Quatuors concertans, oeuvre XIV, in D, B-flat, F minor, G, E-flat, & G minor, published by Boyer, 1785.

Vocal music
Recueil d'airs et duos avec orchestre: stamped Conservatoire de musique #4077, now in the music collection of the Bibliothèque Nationale, contains:
 Allegro: Loin du soleil, in E-flat.
 Andante: N'êtes vous plus la tendre amie? in F.
 Ariette: Satisfait du plaisir d'aimer; in A.
 Ariette-Andante: (Clemengis) La seule Ernestine qui m'enflamme; in E-flat
 Duo: (Isabelle & Dorval) C'est donc ainsi qu'on me soupconne; in F.
 Scena-Recitavo: Ernestine, que vas tu faire .. as tu bien consulte ton Coeur? in E-flat.
 Aria: O Clemengis, lis dans mon Ame; in C minor.
 Air: Image cherie, Escrits si touchants; in B-flat.
 Air: Que me fait a moi la richesse ... sans songer a Nicette; in F minor.
 Duo: Au prés de vous mon Coeur soupire

Note: The names of the characters, Ernestine and Clemengis, in numbers 4, 6, 7 and 8 of the above pieces indicate they came from the opera Ernestine; number 5 is probably from La Partie de chasse.

The orchestra for all the above consists of strings, two oboes and two horns.

Additional songs

 Air: "Il n'est point, disoit mon père", from the opera Ernestine, in Journal de Paris, 1777.
 Two Airs de la Chasse, "Mathurin dessus l'herbette" and "Soir et matin sous la fougère" "de M. de Saint-Georges" in Journal de La Harpe, of 1779, the first air, no. 9, the second one, no. 10, dated 1781, marked: "With accompagnement by M. Hartman", clearly only the voice part may be considered to be by Saint-Georges. The same is true of an air "de M. de St.-George", "L'Autre jour sous l'ombrage", also in the Journal de La Harpe (8e Année, No. 7), marked: "avec accompagnement par M. Delaplanque".
 Two Italian canzonettas: "Sul margine d'un rio" and "Mamma mia" (different than the spurious "Six Italian Canzonettas") copied by an unknown hand (including the signature) but authenticated by a paraphe (initials) in Saint-Georges' hand. They are in BnF, ms 17411.

Dubious works 
The opera, Le Droit de seigneur taken for a work by Saint-Georges is in fact by J-P. E. Martini: (one aria contributed by Saint-Georges, mentioned in 1784 by Mercure, is lost).

A Symphony in D by "Signor di Giorgio" in the British Library, arranged for pianoforte, as revealed by Prof. Dominique-René de Lerma is by the Earl of Kelly, using a nom de plume.

A quartet for harp and strings, ed. by Sieber, 1777, attributed to Saint-Georges, is mentioned in an advertisement in Mercure de France of September 1778 as: "arranged and dedicated to M. de Saint-Georges" by Delaplanque. This is obviously by the latter.

A sonata in the Recueil Choix de musique in the Bibliothèque Nationale, is a transcription for forte-piano and violin of Saint-Georges' violin concerto in G major, Op. II, No. 1. This is the only piece by Saint-Georges in the entire collection erroneously attributed to him.

Recueil d'Airs avec accompagnement de forte piano par M. de St. Georges pour Mme. La Comtesse de Vauban, sometimes presented as a collection of vocal pieces by Saint-Georges, contains too many numbers obviously composed by others. For example, "Richard Coeur de lion" is by Grétry; "Iphigenie en Tauride" is by Gluck; and an aria from Tarare is by Salieri. Even if Saint-Georges had arranged their orchestral accompaniments for forte-piano, it would be wrong to consider them as his compositions. As for the rest, though some might be by Saint-Georges, since this may only be resolved by a subjective stylistic evaluation, it would be incorrect to accept them all as his work.

Six Italian Canzonettas by a Signor di Giorgio, for voice, keyboard or harp, and The Mona Melodies, a collection of ancient airs from the Isle of Man, in the British Library, are not by Saint-Georges.

Recueil de pieces pour forte piano et violon pour Mme. la comtesse de Vauban erroneously subtitled "Trios" (they are solos and duos), a collection of individual movements, some for piano alone, deserves the same doubts as the Recueil d'Airs pour Mme. Vauban. Apart from drafts for two of Saint-Georges's , too many of these pieces seem incompatible with the composer's style. "Les Caquets" (The Gossips) a violin piece enthusiastically mentioned by some authors as typical of Saint-Georges's style, was composed in 1936 by the violinist Henri Casadesus. He also forged a spurious Handel viola concerto and the charming but equally spurious "Adelaide" concerto supposedly by the 10-year-old Mozart, which Casadesus’ brother, Marius Casadesus later admitted having composed (often incorrectly attributed to Henri as well).

Discography

The following is a list of all known commercial recordings.

Symphonies concertantes

 Symphonie Concertante, Op. IX No. 1 in C: Miroslav Vilimec and Jiri Zilak, violins, Pilsen Radio Orchestra, Frantisek Preisler, conductor, Avenira, 1996–98.
 Symphonie Concertante, Op. IX No. 2 in A: Miroslav Vilimec and Jiri Zilak, violins, Pilsen Radio Orchestra, Frantisek Preisler, conductor, Avenira, 1996–98.
 Symphonie Concertante, Op. X No. 1 in F: Miroslav Vilimec and Jiri Zilak, violins, Jan Motlik, viola, Frantisek Preisler, conductor. Avenira, 1996–98.
 Symphonie Concertante, Op. X No. 2 in A: Miroslav Vilimec and Jiri Zilak, violins, Jan Motlik, viola, Frantisek Preisler, conductor. Avenira, 1996–98.
 Symphonie Concertante, Op. XII (sic) in E-flat: Miroslav Vilimec and Jiri Zilak, violins, Pilsen Radio Orchestra, Frantisek Preisler, conductor. Avenira, 1996–98.
 Symphonie Concertante, Op. XIII in G:
 Miriam Fried and Jamie Laredo, violins, London Symphony Orchestra, Paul Freeman conductor, Columbia Records, 1970.
 Vilimec and Ailak, violins, Pilsen Radio Orchestra, Preisler conductor, Avenira 1996–98.
 Christopher Guiot and Laurent Philippe, violins, with Les Archets de Paris. ARCH, 2000.
 Micheline Blanchard and Germaine Raymond, violins, Ensemble Instrumental Jean-Marie Leclair, Jean-François Paillard, conductor, Erato.
 Huguette Fernandez and Ginette Carles, violins, Orchestre de Chambre Jean-François Paillard, Paillard, conductor, Musical Heritage Society.
 Malcolm Lathem and Martin Jones, violins, Concertante of St. James, London, Nicholas Jackson, conductor, RCA Victor, LBS-4945.

Symphonies

Symphony Op. XI No. 1 in G:

 Orchestre de chambre de Versailles, Fernard Wahl, conductor, Arion, 1981.
 Tafelmusik orchestra, Jeanne Lamon violinist-conductor, Assai M, 2004.
 Le Parlement de musique, Martin Gester conductor, Assai M, 2004.
 Ensemble Instrumental Jean-Marie Leclair, Jean-François Paillard, conductor, Erato n.d., Contemporains Français de Mozart.
 London Symphony Orchestra, Paul Freeman, conductor, Columbia Records, 1974.
 L'Amant anonyme, overture in three movements:
 Tafelmusik Baroque Orchestra, Jeanne Lamon, Conductor, Assai M, 2004
 L'Amant anonyme, contredanse:
 Tafelmusik Baroque Orchestra, Jeanne Lamon, Conductor, Assai M, 2004
 L'Amant anonyme, Ballet No. 1 and No. 6:
 Tafelmusik Baroque Orchestra, Jeanne Lamon, Conductor, Assai M, 2004

Symphony Op. XI No. 2 in D:

 L'Ensemble Instrumental Jean-Marie Leclair, Jean-François Paillard, conductor. Erato, n.d., Contemporains Français de Mozart.
 Orchestre de chambre de Versailles, Bernard Wahl, conductor, Arion, 1981.
 Les Archets de Paris, Christopher Guiot conductor, Archets, 2000.
 Tafelmusik orchestra, Jeanne Lamon, violinist-conductor, Assai M, 2004.
 Le Parlement de musique, Martin Gester, conductor, Assai M, 2004.

Violin concertos

Concerto Op. II, No. 1 in G:
 Miroslav Vilimec, Pilsen Radio Orchestra, Frantisek Preisler conductor, Avenira, 2000.
Concerto Op. II, No. 2 in D:
 Miroslav Vilimec, Pilsen Radio Orchestra, Frantisek Preisler, conductor, Avenira, 2000.
 Stéphanie-Marie Degrand, Le Parlement de musique, Gester, conductor, Assai, 2004.
 Yura Lee, Bayerische Kammerphilharmonie, Reinhard Goebel Conductor, OEHMS Classics, 2007
Concerto Op. III, No. 1 in D:
 Jean-Jacques Kantorow, Orchestre de chambre Bernard Thomas, Arion, 1974.
 Miroslav Vilimec, Pilsen Radio Orchestra, Frantisek Preisler, conductor, Avenira, 2000.
 Linda Melsted, Tafelmusik Orchestra, Jeanne Lamon, violinist-conductor, CBC Records, 2003.
 Qian Zhou, Toronto Camerata, Kevin Mallon, conductor, Naxos, 2004.
Concerto Op. III, No. 2 in C:
 Tamás Major, Orchestra della Svizzera Italiana, Forlane, 1999.
 Miroslav Vilimec, Pilsen Radio Orchestra, Frantisek Preisler, conductor, Avenira, 2000.
Concerto Op. IV, No. 1 in D:
 Miroslav Vilimec, Pilsen Radio Orchestra, Frantisek Preisler, conductor, Avenira 2000.
 Qian Zhou, Camerata Toronto, Kevin Mallon, conductor, Naxos, 2004. (The recording of this concerto was mistakenly reissued by Artaria as Op. posthumus, see incipit of concerto Op. IV, No. 1 in D, in "Works".)
Concerto Op. IV, No. 2 in D:
 Hana Kotková, Orchestra della Svizzera Italiiana, Forlane, 1999.
Concerto Op. V, No. 1 in C:
 Jean-Jacques Kantorow, Orchestre de chambre Bernard Thomas, Arion, 1974
 Miroslav Vilimec, Pilsen Radio Orchestra, Frantisek Preisler, conductor, Avenira, 2000.
 Christoph Guiot, Les Archets de Paris, ARCH, 2000
 Takako Nishizaki, Köln Kammerorchester, Helmut Müller-Brühl, conductor, Naxos, 2001.
Concerto Op. V No. 2 in A:
 Jean-Jacques Kantorow, Orchestre de chambre Bernard Thomas, Arion, 1974
 Rachel Barton, Encore Chamber Orchestra, Daniel Hegge, conductor, Cedille, 1997.
 Miroslav Vilimec, Pilsen Radio Orchestra, Frantisek Preisler, conductor, Avenira, 2000.
 Takako Nishizaki, Köln Kammerorchester, Helmut Müller-Brühl, conductor, Naxos, 2001.
Concerto Op. VII No. 1 in A: Anthony Flint, Orchestra della Svizzera Italiana, Forlane, 1999.
Concerto Op. VII No. 2 in B-flat:
 Miroslav Vilimec, Pilsen Radio Orchestra, Frantisek Preisler, conductor, Avenira, 2000.
 Hans Liviabella, Orchestra della Svizzera Italiana, Alain Lombard, conductor, Forlane, 1999.
Concerto Op. VII, No. 1, actually Op. XII, No. 1: in D: Anne–Claude Villars, L'Orchestre de chambre de Versailles, Bernard Wahl, conductor, Arion, 1981.
concerto Op. VII, No. 2, actually Op. XII, No. 2 in G: Anne–Claude Villars, L'Orchestre de chambre de Versailles, Bernard Wahl, conductor, Arion, 1981.
Concerto Op. VIII, No. 1 in D:
 Miroslav Vilimec, Pilsen Radio Orchestra, Frantisek Preisler, conductor, Avenira, 2000.
Concerto Op. VIII, No. 9, actually Op. VIII, No. 2 in G:
 Jean-Jacques Kantorow, Orchestre de chambre Bernard Thomas, Arion, 1976, Koch, 1996.
 Takako Nishizaki, Köln Kammerorchester, Helmut Müller-Brühl, conductor, Naxos, 2001.
 Stéphanie-Marie Degand, Le Parlement de musique, Martin Gester, conductor, Assai M, 2004.
 Miroslav Vilimec, Pilsen Radio Orchestra, Frantisek Preisler, conductor. Avenira, 2000.
Concerto Op. VIII, No. 10, actually Op. XII, No. 1 in D: Miroslav Vilimec, Pilsen Radio Orchestra, Frantisek Preisler, conductor. Avenira, 2000.
Concerto Op. VIII, No. 11, actually Op. XII, No. 2 in G:
 Miroslav Vilimec, Pilsen Radio Orchestra, Frantisek Preisler, conductor. Avenira, 2000.
 Qian Zhou, Toronto Camerata, Kevin Mallon, conductor. Naxos 2004. (Listed as Concerto No. 10 in G in the recent Artaria Edition) The Largo of this recording is identical with that of Op. V, No. 2 in A.

(As mentioned above, a Concerto with Qian Zhou, reissued by Artaria as "Op. Posthumus in D", is the same as Op. IV, No. 1.)

Chamber music

String Quartets:

Six quartets Op. 1 (1771).

 Juilliard Quartet, Columbia Records, 1974.
 Antarés, B-flat only Integral, 2003.
 Coleridge, AFKA, 1998.
 Jean-Noël Molard, Arion 1995.

Six Quatuors Concertans, "Au gout du jour", no opus number (1779).

 Coleridge Quartet, AFKA, 2003.
 Antarés, Integral 2003.

Six Quartets Op. 14 (1785).

 Quatuor Apollon, Avenira, 2005.
 Joachim Quartet, Koch Schwann 1996.
 Quatuor Les Adieux, Auvidis Valois, 1996.
 Quatuor Atlantis, Assai, M 2004.
 Quatuor Apollon, Avenira, 2005

Three keyboard and violin sonatas (Op. 1a):

 J. J. Kantorow, violin, Brigitte Haudebourg, Clavecin, Arion 1979.
 Stéphanie-Marie Degand, Violin, Alice Zylberach, piano, Assai M, 2004.

Miscellaneous
Adagio in F minor, edited by de Lerma, performance notes by Natalie Hinderas, Orion, 1977.
Air d'Ernestine: Faye Robinson, soprano, London Symphony Orchestra, Paul Freeman conductor, Columbia Records, 1970.
 Overture and two Airs of Leontine from L'Amant anonyme: Enfin, une foule importune: Du tendre amour: Odile Rhino, soprano, Les Archets de Paris, Christophe Guiot conductor, Archives Records, 2000.
 Excerpts from Ballets No. 1 & 2, and Contredance from L'Amant anonyme, Tafelmusik Orchestra, Jeanne Lamon, violinist-conductor, CBC Records, 2003.

In popular culture
Saint-Georges' life and career was the subject of the biographical film Chevalier, in which he was portrayed by Kelvin Harrison Jr.. It premiered at the 2022 Toronto International Film Festival and will be released theatrically in April 2023.

Footnotes

Notes

Citations

Works cited

Further reading
 
 
 
 
 
 
 
 
 
 
 
 
 
 
 
 
 père,

External links

 
 Biography and sheet music editions, Artaria Editions
 Chevalierdesaintgeorges.homestead.com
Festival International de Musique Saint-Georges

1745 births
1799 deaths
French male foil fencers
18th-century French male classical violinists
French male classical composers
French male violinists
French opera composers
Male opera composers
French people of Guadeloupean descent
French Freemasons
French Republican military leaders of the French Revolutionary Wars
18th-century classical composers
String quartet composers
18th-century French composers
Black classical composers
Free people of color
French people of Senegalese descent